Little Magician may refer to:

Film
Mostafa aw al-sahir al-saghir (Mostafa or the Little Magician), a 1932 Egyptian film
Magic Magic 3D, a 2003 Indian film, dubbed in Hindi as Chota Jadugar (Little Magician)

People
Martin Van Buren (1782–1862), eighth President of the United States
Philippe Coutinho (born 1992), Brazilian footballer
Lionel Messi (born 1987), Argentinian footballer